The Togolese Hockey Federation ( or  FTH) is the governing body of field hockey in Togo, Africa. Its headquarters are in Lome, Togo. It is affiliated to IHF International Hockey Federation and AHF African Hockey Federation.

Luc Dofontien is the president of Hockey Association of Togo, and Harald Nyagbe is the general secretary.

History

See also
African Hockey Federation

References

External links
 Togo Hockey - FIH
 Togo Hockey-FB

Togo